The Jadira are a people and territory in the Pilbara region of Western Australia.

It was mentioned by Norman Tindale in his classic ethnographic map of Australian tribes. The status of Jadira in the sense defined by Tindale has been recently questioned by Paul Burke.

Ascribed country
The Jadira occupied the areas about the middle sections of the Cane and Robe rivers, running south of Mount Minnie, and as far north as the Fortescue River. Their eastern frontier putatively fell short of the western scarp of the higher plateau of the Hamersley Ranges.

Tindale also added a list of alternative names for these Jadira:
 Kawarindjari, Kawarandjari
 Kawarandari
 Kawarindjara
 Kauarind'arri, Kauarndhari
 Garindjari
These terms represented Ngarluma exonyma applied to the Jadira, and bore the sense of "belonging to the west".

The only other information available to Tindale led him to suggest that some of the Jadira, a non-circumcising tribe, with the onset of European colonization, shifted eastwards to Ashburton Downs Station, while a second group moved to the mouth of the Fortescue River where they were assimilated into the Martuthinira. Traditionally, he added, their access to the coastal waters lay through Nhuwala (which Tindale spelt Noala) territory, between the Cane and Robe rivers, a practice Tindale described as "trespassing".

Controversy
Aboriginal Legal Aid lawyer and Land Council lawyer Paul Burke re-examined Tindale's papers and sources when, with regard to a native title claim, he had to work out the precise boundaries for another tribe in this area. He came to the conclusion that the Jadira people and their territory were a misnomer, a phantom category, inexplicably created by Tindale on otherwise very thin evidence.

The primary source for Tindale's thesis lies in a single reference to the Kau'arndhäri in a 1914 paper by Daisy Bates, where Bates names it as one of four western Pilbara tribes – the others being the Ngarluma, the Kariera, and the Martuthinira – whose class system, governing marriages, is, she claimed, identical. Bates does not mention the Jadira, but Tindale drew the conclusion that it was the endonym of the Kau'arndhäri, on the basis of a report by Carl Georg von Brandenstein, who glossed the latter term by the former.

Notes

Citations

Sources

Aboriginal peoples of Western Australia
Western Australia